Abdul Gafur (20 June 1939 - 4 September 2020) was an Indonesian politician.

Biography
He was a Member of the People's Representative Council from 1997 to 2009, as well as 1972 till 1978. 

In 1978 Gafur resigned as an MP after he was appointed Minister of Youth and Sport of Indonesia, where he served till 1988. 

From 1988 till 1997, Gafur served as a member of the Supreme Advisory Council.

Gafur died from COVID-19 aged 81.

References

1939 births
2020 deaths
Golkar politicians
Deaths from the COVID-19 pandemic in Indonesia
Members of the People's Representative Council, 1999
Members of the People's Representative Council, 2004
Members of the People's Representative Council, 1997
Government ministers of Indonesia